The Inverness and District Football Association runs amateur football around the city of Inverness, in the Highlands of Scotland. They are affiliated to the Scottish Amateur Football Association.

The association runs three divisions with promotion and relegation, playing a summer season, in common with most amateur and welfare leagues in the North of Scotland.

Current Teams 
Teams Due to participate in the 2022 season:

Premier Division

Ardersier
Avoch
Black Rock Rovers
Contin
Culloden Blacksmiths
IRN Security
Loch Ness
Maryburgh
Tomatin

1st Division

Balloan
Black Isle
Conon Bridge
Drakies
Hill Rovers
Innes CI
Invergordon SC
Inverness Athletic
NMM Sam's

2nd Division

Clachnacuddin
Ferrybache
Fortrose & Rosemarkie Union
G16 United
Gellions
Highland Athletic
Highland Hospice
Ness Thistle
Ness City
Tomatin Utd

Past winners

References

Football in Highland (council area)
Sport in Inverness
Football leagues in Scotland
Amateur association football in Scotland